Michael Wall may refer to:

 Michael Wall (playwright) (1946–1991), British playwright
 Michael Wall (ice hockey) (born 1985), former ice hockey goaltender
 Michael Wall (swimmer) (born 1946), American swimmer